Ruiner Pinball is a pinball video game developed by High Voltage Software and published by Atari Corporation exclusively for Atari Jaguar on November 6, 1995. It was marketed as the first game to feature support for the Jaguar's ProController, though the only difference that the controller provides is that its shoulder buttons can be used as an alternative way of nudging the table.

In Ruiner Pinball, players can choose between any of the two available playfields, which both have their own thematic and self-contained story. The game originated as a project pitched by High Voltage Software to Atari Corporation, who wanted to create a pinball title for the Jaguar, as members within the company were fans of the genre. Ruiner Pinball garnered mostly negative reception from critics since its release but it has been recently referred by publications like PC Magazine as one of the best titles for the system.

Gameplay 

Ruiner Pinball is an arcade-style pinball game, featuring two types of pinball tables and each one has their own main objective, gameplay mechanics, plot and thematic. The game has three levels of difficulty and the player can set the number of balls for play, turn on or off the picture-in-picture display window, apply texture to the ball and enter the number of players at the options menu.

High scores and other settings made by the player are automatically kept via the cartridge's internal EEPROM. The player can also reset the internal memory of the cartridge to erase saved high-scores and personal settings.

Tables 
Ruiner is a two-screen wide table that features a four sets of flippers, taking place during the Cold War in 1962 as a nuclear war is about to begin. The main objective of the player is to bring down the DEFCON level from level 5 to 1 and launch the attack on an enemy country while defending their own.

Tower is a three-screen tall table, featuring three sets of flippers and takes place in a fantasy setting, when an adventurer enters into a sinister castle tower to defeat an evil sorceress that resides within its walls, with the main objective of the player being able to make the sorceress cast three magic spells in order to destroy the castle tower, bring her down and then escape from the tower before it is too late.

Development and release 

Scott Corley, main programmer and one of the designers of Ruiner Pinball at High Voltage Software, recounted about the game's development process in a thread at the 3DO Zone forums. The company pitched the idea of a pinball project for the Jaguar to Atari Corporation by showcasing a working demo that was written in a few days by Scott, who got free rein to create it from High Voltage Software CEO Kerry J. Ganofsky, since many of the members within the company were fans of pinball and liked the idea of developing one, with Scott citing both Night Mission Pinball and Raster Blaster as his childhood favorites.

After Atari Corp. greenlighted the idea upon seeing the demo, work on the project begun and at one point during its development, the company requested the project's name in order to advertise it. When looking at his personal music collection, Scott christened the project as Ruiner, which was named after the song of the same name featured in Nine Inch Nails' second studio album The Downward Spiral and as a result, he told Kerry Ganofsky about the name and the latter proceeded to send it to Atari Corp. The project was one of his first works in the video game industry. Originally, the game was set to have only one board to play but Atari Corp. requested to have two boards instead. Ruiner Pinball was showcased under its original name in an early but playable state during SCES '94, featuring vastly different board designs compared to the final release.

Scott also recounted that all the game boards and their respective artwork were hand-drawn and painted on "a huge board" by Mike Baker, who also worked as a designer for the title. They were scanned, pieced together and corrected in Deluxe Paint. He stated that the process was a difficult task "because there was no scanner that large" at the time. Ruiner Pinball was also showcased in a near-complete playable state at both E3 1995 and at Spring ECTS '95. In an interview with Adisak Pochanayon, lead programmer of NBA Jam: Tournament Edition as well for being one of the programmers of White Men Can't Jump on the Jaguar, stated that Ruiner Pinball was written in C++ by Scott. The game was also showcased during the Fun 'n' Games Day event hosted by Atari. The game was included as part of the Atari 50: The Anniversary Celebration compilation for Nintendo Switch, PlayStation 4, Steam, and Xbox One, marking its first re-release.

Reception 

The game received mostly poor reviews. A review by Next Generation gave it only two stars out of five, explaining that the game does not play well due to "rigid" animation and unrealistic, unpredictable physics. They added that the game makes good use of the video game format with its multi-tiered tables and animated targets, but that these elements are "superfluous" without good playability. GamePro'''s brief review described the game as enjoyable but unexceptional, saying that it "looks like a plain old 16-bit pinball game" and offers nothing unusual in its pinball action aside from the unusually large tables. The Electric Playground gave Ruiner Pinball a four out of ten, calling it "the Latoya Jackson of video pinball games". They elaborated that the gameplay is "boring and tedious" and that the blurry and overly busy visuals cause the ball to be frequently lost against the backgrounds. VideoGames scored Ruiner Pinball a five out of ten, comparing it with other pinball video games from the 16-bit era such as Dragon's Revenge and Crüe Ball. The reviewer criticized the graphics and plot of the two tables, while also remarking that the game does not simulate the feel of playing pinball accurately. Ultimate Future Games also gave the game a low score, with the reviewer criticizing almost every aspect of the game. He remarked that "Ruiner is not even not very good pinball". However, when reviewing the game for French magazine Consoles +'', Elvira gave it a positive outlook with praise to the graphics, presentation, music and playability.

References

External links 
 
 Ruiner Pinball at AtariAge
 Ruiner Pinball at GameFAQs
 Ruiner Pinball at MobyGames

1995 video games
Apocalyptic video games
Atari games
Atari Jaguar games
Cold War video games
Fantasy video games
Multiplayer and single-player video games
High Voltage Software games
Pinball video games
Video games developed in the United States
Video games set in 1962